Amblystogenium is a genus of beetles in the family Carabidae, containing the following species:

 Amblystogenium minimum Luff, 1972
 Amblystogenium pacificum (Putzeys, 1869)

Description

Distribution

References

Trechinae